Twice Upon A Time (French: Il était une seconde fois) is a four-part French sci-fi drama miniseries first broadcast in 2019, directed by Guillaume Nicloux, starring Gaspard Ulliel and Freya Mavor. The miniseries was broadcast in France via the network Arte on 29 August 2019. It was released in the United States on Netflix on 19 December 2019. Twice Upon A Time was the second collaboration between director Guillaume Nicloux and actor Gaspard Ulliel, the first was the 2018 war film To the Ends of the World.

Plot 
Vincent Dauda, in his thirties, dreams of winning back his ex, Louise. He's grief-stricken and driven to despair, kisses the break-up goodbye with nocturnal parties, ephemeral affairs... until the day when a delivery man gives him a parcel he never ordered. A strange box, without any bottom, through which he can time travel, which takes him back to Louise's side, before they split up.

Cast 
Gaspard Ulliel as Vincent Dauda
Freya Mavor as Louise Arron
Patrick d'Assumçao as André
 Jonathan Manzambi as Livreur
Steve Tran as Than
Claire Sermonne as Nadège
Richard Dillane as David Arron
Jonathan Couzinié as Romain
 Sacha Canuyt as Stanley
Yves Cape as François
Steve Whiteley as James
 Marie Gaillet as Chloé
 Yvan Delatour as Jordan
Esteban Carvajal Alegria as Thibault
Sylvain Creuzevault as Alexis
Eva Ionesco as Annie Arron
Alaa Safi as Nordine
Paul Bandey as the English doctor
Lukas Ionesco as Clément
Émile Berling as Raphaël
Julianne Binard as Sophie
Éric Viellard as Franck Rivière
Aurélia Thierrée as Madam Reverty
Anthony Paliotti a Stéphane
Magali Heu as Claire
Thomas Rodriguez as Jordan
Juliette Joy Anquetil as Gwen

Production

Casting
Gaspard Ulliel was announced as the male lead on 18 September 2017. Stacy Martin was announced as the female lead on 26 December 2017. Martin's name was still listed in casting calls until 5 January 2018. Freya Mavor replaced Martin on 18 January 2018, a week before filming started.

Filming
Filming started on 29 January 2018 and ended on 6 April 2018. Shooting took place in Paris, London, Bordeaux, and Iceland.

Release
On February 11, 2019, it was announced that Federation Entertainment had acquired worldwide rights to the series. Federation holds worldwide rights to the series outside Germany and German-speaking territories.

All of the four episodes of the miniseries were screened at the Berlin International Film Festival on 12 February 2019.

The miniseries aired on the French TV channel Arte on 29 August 2019, and was made available for streaming in full on arte.tv from August 22 to 26 October 2019. It was released in the United States through Netflix on 19 December 2019.

References

External links 

2010s French television miniseries
2010s French drama television series
2010s romance television series
French time travel television series
French science fiction television series
2010s science fiction television series
2019 French television series debuts
2019 French television series endings
2010s time travel television series
Serial drama television series
Television series set in the 21st century